Malakpet Assembly constituency is a constituency of Telangana Legislative Assembly, India. It is one of 15 constituencies in Capital city of Hyderabad. It is part of Hyderabad Lok Sabha constituency.

Ahmed bin Abdullah Balala of AIMIM is representing the constituency for second time.

Extent of the constituency
The Assembly Constituency presently comprises the following neighbourhoods:

Elected Members

Election results

Telangana Legislative Assembly election, 2018

Telangana Legislative Assembly election, 2014

References

See also
 Malakpet
 List of constituencies of Telangana Legislative Assembly

Assembly constituencies of Telangana